The Mentor Toruń Cup is an annual figure skating competition held in January in Toruń, Poland. The competition may include men's singles, ladies' singles, pair skating, and ice dancing at various levels.

Senior medalists

Men

Ladies

Pairs

Ice dance

Junior medalists

Men

Ladies

Pairs

Ice dance

Advanced novice medalists

Men

Ladies

Pairs

Ice dance

References

External links 
 
 Polish Figure Skating Association

Figure skating competitions
MNNT
Sport in Toruń